Jack in the Box is an American fast-food restaurant chain founded February 21, 1951, by Robert O. Peterson (1916–1994) in San Diego, California, where it is headquartered. The chain has over 2,200 locations, primarily serving the West Coast of the United States. Restaurants are also found in selected large urban areas outside the West Coast, including Phoenix, Salt Lake City, Denver, Albuquerque, El Paso, Dallas-Fort Worth, Houston, Austin, San Antonio, Oklahoma City, Baton Rouge, Nashville, Charlotte, Kansas City, St. Louis, Indianapolis, and Cincinnati as well as one in Guam. The company also formerly operated the Qdoba Mexican Grill chain until Apollo Global Management bought the chain in December 2017.

Food items include a variety of chicken tenders and French fries along with hamburger and cheeseburger sandwiches and selections of internationally themed foods such as tacos and egg rolls.

History
Robert Oscar Peterson already owned several successful restaurants when he opened Topsy's Drive-In at 6270 El Cajon Boulevard in San Diego in 1941. Several more Topsy's were opened. By the late 1940s, Peterson's locations had developed a circus-like décor featuring drawings of a starry-eyed clown.
In 1947, Peterson obtained rights for the intercom ordering concept from George Manos who owned one location named Chatterbox in Anchorage, Alaska, the first known location to use the intercom concept for drive-up windows.
In 1951, Peterson converted the El Cajon Boulevard location into Jack in the Box, a hamburger stand focused on drive-through service. While the drive-through concept was not new, Jack in the Box innovated a two-way intercom system, the first major chain to use an intercom and the first to focus on drive-through. The intercom allowed much faster service than a traditional drive-up window; while one customer was being served at the window, a second and even a third customer's order could be taken and prepared. A giant clown projected from the roof, and a smaller clown head sat atop the intercom, where a sign said, "Pull forward, Jack will speak to you." The Jack in the Box restaurant was conceived as a "modern food machine," designed by La Jolla, California master architect Russell Forester. Quick service made the new location very popular, and soon all of Oscar's locations were redesigned with intercoms and rechristened Jack in the Box restaurants.

Peterson formed Foodmaker, Inc. as a holding company for Jack in the Box in 1960. At this time, all Jack in the Box locations—over 180, mainly in California and the Southwest—were company-owned. Location sites, food preparation, quality control, and the hiring and training of on-site managers and staff in each location were subject to rigorous screening and strict performance standards.

In 1968, Peterson sold Foodmaker to Ralston Purina Company. In the 1970s, Foodmaker led the Jack in the Box chain toward its most prolific growth (television commercials in the early 1970s featured child actor Rodney Allen Rippy) and began to franchise locations. The chain began to increasingly resemble its larger competitors, particularly industry giant McDonald's. Jack in the Box began to struggle in the latter part of the decade; its expansion into East Coast markets was cut back, then halted. By the end of the decade, Jack in the Box restaurants were sold in increasing numbers.

Around 1980, Foodmaker dramatically altered Jack in the Box's marketing strategy by literally blowing up the chain's symbol, the jack in the box, in television commercials with the tagline, "The food is better at the Box". Jack in the Box announced that it would no longer compete for McDonald's target customer base of families with young children. Instead, Foodmaker targeted older, more affluent "yuppie" customers with a higher-quality, more upscale menu and a series of whimsical television commercials featuring Dan Gilvezan, who attempted to compare the new menu items to that of McDonald's and other fast-food chains, to no avail; hence "There's No Comparison", their slogan at the time. Jack in the Box restaurants were remodeled and redecorated with decorator pastel colors and hanging plants; the logo, containing a clown's head in a red box with the company name in red text to or below the box (signs in front of the restaurant displayed the clown's head only), was modified, stacking the words in a red diagonal box while still retaining the clown's head; by about 1981 or 1982, the clown's head was removed from the logo, which would remain until 2009.

Television advertising from about 1985 onward featured minimalistic music by a small chamber-like ensemble (specifically a distinctive seven-note plucked musical signature). The menu, previously focused on hamburgers led by the flagship Jumbo Jack, became much more diverse, including salads, chicken sandwiches, finger foods, and Seasoned Curly Fries (at least two new menu items were introduced per year), at a time when few fast-food operations offered more than standard hamburgers. Annual sales increased through the 1980s. Ralston Purina tried further to mature the restaurant's image, renaming it "Monterey Jack's" in late 1985. The name change proved to be a disaster, and the Jack in the Box name was restored in early 1986.

After 18 years, Ralston Purina decided in 1985 that Foodmaker was a non-core asset and sold it to management. By 1987, sales reached $655 million, the chain boasted 897 restaurants, and Foodmaker became a publicly-traded company.

At their annual meeting in July 2018, the National Jack in the Box Franchisee Association, which represents the owners of about 2,000 of the chain's 2,240 restaurants, voted "no confidence" in the company's chief executive officer, Leonard "Lenny" Comma, and called for him to resign. In December 2019, Comma said he would be stepping down.

On December 6, 2021, Jack in the Box announced that it was acquiring Del Taco for $12.51 per share. Del Taco has approximately 600 locations in 16 US states. The acquisition was finalized in March 2022.

JBX Grill 
JBX Grill was a line of fast casual restaurants introduced in 2004 by Jack in the Box Inc. They featured high-quality, cafe-style food, avoiding most of the cheaper fast-food items typically served at Jack in the Box. The architecture and decor maintained an upbeat, positive atmosphere, and the customer service was comparable to most dine-in restaurants. Two of the Jack in the Box restaurants in San Diego (where Jack in the Box is headquartered) were converted to JBX Grill restaurants to test the concept. (The locations in Hillcrest and Pacific Beach still retain many of the JBX elements, including an indoor/outdoor fireplace and modern architecture.) There were also restaurants in Bakersfield, California, Boise, Idaho, and Nampa, Idaho. However, the concept later proved unsuccessful, and the last stores were reconverted to Jack in the Box in 2006.

Products 

Although best known for its hamburgers, Jack in the Box's most popular product is its taco, which it has sold since the first restaurant in the 1950s. , the company sold 554 million a year manufactured in three factories in Texas and Kansas. What makes the taco unusual is that it is created with the meat and hard taco shell in the Texas and Kansas facilities, then frozen for transport and storage. At the restaurant, it is then deep-fried, then prepared with lettuce, cheese, and mild taco sauce before serving.

Besides tacos, other Americanized foods from ethnic cuisines that Jack in the Box offers include egg rolls, breakfast burritos, and poppers. New items come in on a rotation every three to four months, including the Philly cheesesteak and the deli style pannidos (deli trio, ham & turkey, zesty turkey) which were replaced by Jack's ciabatta burger and included the original ciabatta burger and the bacon 'n' cheese ciabatta. Jack in the Box also carries seasonal items such as pumpkin pie shakes, Oreo mint shakes, and eggnog shakes during the Thanksgiving and Christmas holidays. In some locations, local delicacies are a regular part of the menu. Locations in Hawaii, for example, include the Paniolo Breakfast (Portuguese sausage, eggs, and rice platter) and teriyaki chicken and rice bowl. In the Southern United States, the company offers biscuits and sweet tea. In Imperial County, California, some locations sell date shakes, reflecting the crop's ubiquity in the region's farms. In the spring of 2007, Jack in the Box also introduced its sirloin burger and followed this up recently with the sirloin steak melt. Its more recent foray into the deli market was the less-popular Ultimate Club Sandwich which was initially removed in Arizona due to poor sales and has since been phased out at all locations.

The Bonus Jack was first released in 1970 and has been reintroduced to Jack in the Box menus at times throughout the years, still containing "Jack's secret sauce". In November 2009, the company discontinued its popular ciabatta sandwiches/burgers. In 2012, Jack in the Box introduced a bacon milkshake as part of its "Marry Bacon" campaign.

The Sourdough Jack, which uses two slices of sourdough bread with a hamburger patty, has been around since 1997 (although it was first introduced in 1991 as the "Sourdough Grilled Burger").

In September 2013, Jack's Munchie Meal was introduced. There are 4 different Munchie Meals: Spicy Nacho Chicken Sandwich, Sriracha Curly Fry Burger, Stacked Grilled Cheeseburger, and Chick-n-Tater Melt. Each meal also contains 2 tacos, halfsie fries (curly fries and french fries), and a 20 oz. drink.

In October 2016, the "Brunchfast" items were introduced. Those are Bacon & Egg Chicken Sandwich, Blood Orange Fruit Cooler, Brunch Burger, Cranberry Orange Muffins, Homestyle Potatoes, and Southwest Scrambler Plate.

In January 2018, the "Food Truck Series" sandwiches were introduced, including the Asian Fried Chicken, Pork Belly BLT, and Prime Rib Cheesesteak.

In January 2023, Jack in the Box started selling Red Bull Infusions drinks at its locations.

In February 2023, Jack in the Box partnered with Mint Mobile and Ryan Reynolds. A minty version of the classic Oreo Shake was created and titled the "Mint Mobile Shake" to promote the mobile virtual network operator. A 15-second promotion video was featured on February 27, 2023, with Ryan Reynolds as the spokesperson.

Advertising

The restaurant rebounded in popularity in 1994 after a highly successful marketing campaign that featured the fictitious Jack in the Box chairman Jack character (formerly voiced by the campaign's creator Rick Sittig), who has a ping pong ball-like head, a yellow clown cap, two blue eyes, a pointy black nose, and a linear red smile that changes with his emotions, and is dressed in a business suit.

Jack was reintroduced specifically to signal the new direction the company was taking to refocus and regroup after the 1993 E. coli disaster, discussed below, which threatened the chain's very existence. In the original spot that debuted in Fall 1994, Jack ("through the miracle of plastic surgery", he says as he confidently strides into the office building) reclaims his rightful role as founder and CEO, and, apparently as revenge for being blown up in 1980, approaches the closed doors of the Jack in the Box boardroom (a fictionalized version, shown while the aforementioned minimalist theme music from the 1980s Jack in the Box commercials plays), activates a detonation device, and the boardroom explodes in a shower of smoke, wood, and paper. The spot ends with a close-up shot of a small white paper bag, presumably filled with Jack in the Box food, dropping forcefully onto a table; the bag is printed with the words "Jack's Back" in bold red print, then another bag drops down with the Jack in the Box logo from that period. Later ads feature the first bag showing the text of the food item or offer the commercial is promoting (both bags have featured text since 1998).

A commercial was released in 1997 where Jack goes to the house of a man who has records of calling Jack in the Box "Junk in the Box". When the man shoves Jack yelling "Beat it clown!", Jack chases him outside, tackles him to the ground, and forces him to try Jack's food and confess his deed. The commercial ends with Jack saying "I'm sorry for the grass stains." "Really?" "No".

The commercials in the "Jack's Back" campaign (which has won several advertising industry awards) tend to be lightly humorous and often involve Jack making business decisions about the restaurant chain's food products, or out in the field getting ideas for new menu items. While a series of ads claiming to ask when Burger King and McDonald's will change their ways about making their hamburgers featured a phone number, the caller used to be a recording of Jack himself (as of 2019, the number is a sex hotline). In addition, many commercials have advertised free car antenna balls with every meal, thus increasing brand awareness. Often different types of antenna balls were available during a holiday or major event or themed toward a sports team local to the restaurant. The antenna balls have since been discontinued due to the demise of the mast-type car antenna.

During the height of the now-defunct XFL, one of the continuing ad series involved a fictitious professional American football team owned by Jack. The team, called the Carnivores, played against teams such as the Tofu Eaters and the Vegans.

In 1997, a successful advertising campaign was launched using a fictional musical group called the Spicy Crispy Girls (a take off of the Spice Girls, a British pop music girl group - at the time one of the most popular groups in the world), in comedic national television commercials. The commercials were used to promote the new Jack in the Box Spicy Crispy Chicken Sandwich (now known as Jack's Spicy Chicken), with the girls dancing in "the Jack groove." The Spicy Crispy Girls concept was used as a model for another successful advertising campaign called the 'Meaty Cheesy Boys' to promote the Ultimate Cheeseburger in 1999-2001 (see below).
At the 1998 Association of Independent Commercial Producers (AICP) Show, one of the Spicy Crispy Girls commercials won the top award for humor.

The Meaty Cheesy Boys, a mock boy band to promote the Ultimate Cheeseburger, were created in 1999 during an ad campaign featuring an out-of-control advertising executive previously fired by Jack. The boy band would eventually perform their hit "Ultimate Cheesebuger" at the 1999 Billboard Music Awards. The same ad exec featured in a 2001 spot where a medical doctor made exaggerated claims of the benefits of fast food that it would cure baldness, help trim extra pounds, and remove wrinkles. Jack asks the ad exec incredulously, "Where did you find this guy?" The ad exec responds proudly, "Tobacco company."

In 2000, an ad involved a man washed up on a remote island with only a Jack in the Box antenna ball as a company. Later that year, director Robert Zemeckis, claiming the agency had appropriated elements of his Oscar-nominated film Cast Away for the ad, had his lawsuit against the ad agency thrown out.

In April 2006, Jack in the Box launched an ad campaign called Bread is Back, taking a stab at the low carbohydrate diets of recent years.

In 2006, Jack in the Box took the use of this perception creating a commercial featuring a typical stoner who is indecisive about ordering. When faced with a decision, the Jack in the Box figurine in his car tells him to "stick to the classics" and order 30 tacos implying that he has the "munchies". This ad later stirred up controversy among a San Diego teen group who claimed that the ad was irresponsible showing a teenager who was under the influence of drugs. To protest, they presented the company with 2000 postcards protesting the ad, despite the fact that it had not aired since the beginning of the previous month. This commercial was redone in 2009 to feature the new logo and the new Campaign.

Another ad touting the chain's milkshakes aired in 2001 and was shot in the stilted style of a 1970s-era anti-drug spot, urging kids to "say no to fake shakes" and featured "Larry The Crime Donkey," a parody of McGruff the Crime Dog.

In 2007, Jack in the Box began a commercial campaign for their new 100% sirloin beef hamburgers, implying that they were of higher quality than the Angus beef used by Carl's Jr., Hardee's, Wendy's, and Burger King. That May, CKE Restaurants, Inc., the parent company of Carl's Jr. and Hardee's, filed a lawsuit against Jack in the Box, Inc. CKE claimed, among other things, that the commercials tried to give the impression that Carl's Jr./Hardee's Angus beef hamburgers contained cow anuses by having an actor swirl his finger in the air in a circle while saying "Angus" in one commercial and having other people in the second commercial laugh when the word "Angus" was mentioned. They also attacked Jack in the Box's claim that sirloin, a cut found on all cattle, was of higher quality than Angus beef, which is a breed of cattle.

During Super Bowl XLIII on February 1, 2009, a commercial depicted Jack in a full-body cast after getting hit by a bus. In October 2009, Jack in the Box debuted a popular commercial to market their "Teriyaki Bowl" meals. The commercial features employees getting "bowl cut" haircuts. At the end of the commercial, Jack reveals that his "bowl cut" is a wig, to the dismay of the employees.

Logo 

The One variation has a miniature clown hat (dating back to October 1977) with three dots in the upper left-hand corner; the clown head was removed in 1980. In October 1977, the clown head was in a red box all by itself, with the company name either below or next to the box; signs in front of the restaurants had the clown head only. The "clown head" can be seen on several YouTube videos depicting Jack in the Box commercials from the 1970s and 1980s. Most Jack in the Box locations opened before late 2008 had this logo, although the chain has been replacing them with the newer logo throughout the 2010s, along with general updating of their decor. Some locations continue to use this logo as their "Open/Closed" sign.

Controversies

Mislabeled meat
In 1981, horse meat labeled as beef was discovered at a Foodmaker plant that supplied hamburger and taco meat to Jack in the Box. The meat was originally from Profreeze of Australia, and during their checks on location, the food inspectors discovered other shipments destined for the United States which included kangaroo meat.

E. coli outbreak

In 1993, Jack in the Box suffered a major corporate crisis involving E. coli O157:H7 bacteria. Four children died of hemolytic uremic syndrome and 600 others were reported sick after eating undercooked patties contaminated with fecal material containing the bacteria at a location in Tacoma, Washington and other parts of the Pacific Northwest. The chain was faced with several lawsuits, each of which was quickly settled (but left the chain nearly bankrupt and losing customers). At the time, Washington state law required that hamburgers be cooked to an internal temperature of at least , the temperature necessary to kill E. coli bacteria, although the FDA requirement at that time was only , which was the temperature Jack in the Box cooked. After the incident, Jack in the Box mandated that in all nationwide locations, their hamburgers be cooked to at least . Additionally, all meat products produced in the United States are required to comply with HACCP (Hazard Analysis and Critical Control Points) regulations. Every company that produces meat products is required to have a HACCP plan that is followed continuously. Jack in the Box also worked with food safety experts from manufacturing companies and created a comprehensive program to test for bacteria in every food product.

Locations 

In 2005, Jack in the Box announced plans for nationwide expansion by 2010. In support of this objective, the chain began airing ads in states several hundred miles from the nearest location.

The expansion strategy at that time was targeted at Colorado, Delaware, Florida and Texas. In 2007, the first new Colorado store opened in Golden, Colorado, marking an end to Jack in the Box's 11-year-long absence from the state.

In Albuquerque, New Mexico, several locations opened in June 2009. Jack in the Box restaurants last made an appearance in the Albuquerque market about two decades prior.

In September 2010, it was announced that 40 under-performing company-owned Jack in the Box restaurants located mostly in Texas and the Southeast would close.

In March 2011, Jack in the Box launched the Munchie Mobile in San Diego, a food truck that will serve Jack's burgers and fries. In June 2012, Jack in the Box launched their second food truck in the southeast region of the United States. Another truck was launched for the Northern Texas area in April 2013.

In January 2012, Jack in the Box opened its first of three locations in the Indianapolis area. A few months later, the first Ohio location opened in September 2012 in West Chester.

Restatement
On December 16, 2004, the company restated three years of results due to an accounting change that prompted the company to cut first-quarter and 2005 earnings expectations.

Sponsorship
In November 2017 Jack in the Box became a sponsor of the Dallas Fuel And Team Envy, a team in the Overwatch League and a  professional video game-playing team respectively. 

They are also the current sponsor for the San Francisco 49ers. Certain locations (mainly in the San Francisco Bay Area) have a deal where if the 49ers score two touchdowns, you can purchase a large drink and get a free Jumbo Jack with it the day after the game.

See also
 List of hamburger restaurants

References

External links

 
 
 Official corporate website
 Jack in the Box on Instagram

 
1951 establishments in California
1980s initial public offerings
Companies based in San Diego
Companies listed on the Nasdaq
Economy of the Midwestern United States
Economy of the Southeastern United States
Economy of the Western United States
Fast-food chains of the United States
Fast-food franchises
Fast-food hamburger restaurants
Ralston Purina
Regional restaurant chains in the United States
Restaurants established in 1951
Restaurants in San Diego County, California